The Palais des Fêtes (Festival Palace) is a music venue in the Neustadt district of Strasbourg, in the French department of the Bas-Rhin. Built for the male choral society of Strasbourg in 1903, it has served as the principal concert hall of the city and home to the Orchestre philharmonique de Strasbourg until 1975. It has been classified as a Monument historique since 2007.

Well known conductors such as Gustav Mahler, Richard Strauss, Charles Munch, Bruno Walter, Wilhelm Furtwängler, Herbert von Karajan, Karel Ančerl, Pierre Boulez and Lorin Maazel, among others, have all conducted guest concerts in the Palais.

History

The Palais des Fêtes was built as the Sängerhaus (singer's house) between 1901 and 1903, when Strasbourg was a German city and the capital of Alsace-Lorraine. It was one of the first buildings in Strasbourg to make use of reinforced concrete. The building also included a restaurant large enough to accommodate up to 300 guests. The inauguration concert took place on 31 January 1903. In 1904, the premises were already considered too small and a new story was added on the current rue de Phalsbourg, including a rehearsal room now called Salle Balanchine. A pipe organ was installed in the main hall in 1909. A work by builders , it was designed, like several other pipe organs in Strasbourg (for instance the choir pipe organ of Saint-Thomas church), according to principles by Albert Schweitzer.

Plans to further expand the size and capacity of the Sängerhaus by adding a new wing at the rear were set up shortly before World War I. Strasbourg was again a French city when work was finally conducted. Architect Paul Dopff (1885–1965) added a wing in a more severe style, closer to Beaux-Arts architecture, in 1921. That wing was centred around a great room for choir rehearsals called Salle de la Marseillaise.

The inner decoration of the main auditorium was completely modified in 1933 according to principles of New Objectivity. The stucco and chandeliers were all removed, the organ case lost most of its ornaments. The other parts of the building mostly retained their Art Nouveau decoration and elements, including stained glass and door handles.

During World War II, the basement of the Palais served as an air-raid shelter. Although Strasbourg was bombed several times in 1944, the Palais was not hit.

Since the Orchestre philharmonique moved out of the Palais des Fêtes and into the Palais de la musique et des congrès in 1975, the 1903 venue has still served for concerts, but less frequently. It is still home to La Philharmonie, a medium-sized semi-professional orchestra founded in 1900 that performs three times a year, and occasionally hosts jazz, rock, gospel and other non-classical music genres. The Marseillaise wing is home to the municipal ballet school. The Sängerhaus wing also regularly hosts conventions such as the anime convention ″Japan Addict".

The Palais des Fêtes is undergoing restoration since 2011 and until 2021; the concert hall was expected to be ready in December 2019 and an inaugural symphonic concert was scheduled for 31 January 2020, but on 24 January 2020, it was announced that the opening would be delayed until autumn of the same year. Restoration began with the Marseillaise wing, whose central courtyard was covered with a glass roof in order to create an atrium. Remains of the Neo-Baroque vault ornaments from 1903 were unexpectedly rediscovered in 2018.

Layout
The main entrance to the Palais is on rue Sellénick, a street created in 1888 (original name: Julianstraße). The entrance to the rear wing is on boulevard Clémenceau, a street created in 1881 (original name: Steinring). The whole complex takes up half of the square block delimited (clockwise) by boulevard Clémenceau, rue Specklin, rue Sellénick, and rue de Phalsbourg. It does not, however, stand out in height from its immediate surroundings. The only conspicuous element is the octagonal tower at the corner of rues Sellénick and de Phalsbourg, structurally (but not stylistically) close to the tower of the Mulhouse courthouse designed by the same two architects and inaugurated in 1902.

Gallery

See also
Strasbourg Opera House
Strasbourg Music Festival

Footnotes

References

External links

Palais des Fêtes – La Renaissance, published in 2011 by the municipality of Strasbourg 

Art Nouveau architecture in Strasbourg
Music venues completed in 1903
Music venues completed in 1921
Monuments historiques of Strasbourg
20th-century architecture
Music venues in France
Classical music in France